Prakash Parmanand Hinduja (Sindhi: پرڪاش ھندوجا) (born June 1945) is an Indian-born Swiss businessman, the chairman of the Hinduja Group in Europe.

Early life
Prakash Parmanand Hinduja was born in June 1945, the son of Parmanand Hinduja, and educated at university. He is of Sindhi origin.

Starting out in Iran, Tehran, Prakash Hinduja soon moved to Geneva to look after the company’s Europe branch. He has been based out of Monaco since 2008 and presently, is the chairman of Hinduja Group (Europe).

In 2021, Hinduja was investigated for tax evasion, human trafficking, and residency fraud in Switzerland. He was ordered by the Federal Supreme Court of Switzerland to pay CHF125 million as financial collateral.

Personal life
He is married to Kamal Hinduja, they live Monaco, and have two sons, Ajay and Ramkrishan, and a daughter, Renuka.

References

Prakash
Businesspeople from Mumbai
Indian emigrants to Switzerland
1945 births
Swiss people of Indian descent
Living people
Swiss people of Sindhi descent